The  is a national expressway in the Tōhoku region of Japan. It is owned and operated by East Nippon Expressway Company.

Naming

The expressway is officially referred to as the Tōhoku Ōdan Expressway Sakata Route. From Tsuruoka Junction to Sakata-Minato Interchange the expressway is concurrent with the Nihonkai Engan Tōhoku Expressway, which is planned to extend further north to Akita Prefecture and Aomori Prefecture.

Overview

The expressway begins in southern Miyagi Prefecture at a junction with the Tōhoku Expressway and heads west, crossing over into Yamagata Prefecture. The route passes to the north of the Yamagata city area and subsequently meets the Tōhoku-Chūō Expressway. From here the expressway crosses mountainous areas of western Yamagata Prefecture before reaching the city of Tsuruoka near the Japan Sea coastline. The remainder of the expressway follows a northerly course paralleling the coastline to the terminus in the city of Sakata.

The route is incomplete between Gassan Interchange and Yudonosan Interchange which cuts the route into two physically separate sections. Travellers must use National Route 112 to travel between the two interchanges. As of March 2008 there are no plans to make the Yamagata Expressway a single contiguous expressway.

The expressway is 4 lanes from Murata Junction to Yamagata Junction and 2 lanes for all other sections. The speed limit is 80 km/h for the 4-laned section and 70 km/h for the 2-laned sections.

List of interchanges and features

 IC - interchange, SIC - smart interchange, JCT - junction, SA - service area, PA - parking area, BS - bus stop, TN - tunnel, BR - bridge, TB - toll gate

References

External links 

 East Nippon Expressway Company

Expressways in Japan
Roads in Miyagi Prefecture
Roads in Yamagata Prefecture